Tik Tik Tik may refer to:

 Tik Tik Tik (1981 film), an Indian Tamil-language crime-mystery film
 Tik Tik Tik (2018 film), an Indian Tamil-language science fiction film